Sohag Governorate is one of the governorates of Egypt. It is located in the southern part of the country (Upper Egypt), and covers a stretch of the Nile Valley. Since 1960, its capital has been the city of Sohag. Prior to that, the capital was the city of Girga and the name of the governorate was Girga Governorate.

Overview 

The rate of poverty is more than 60% in this governorate but recently some social safety networks have been provided in the form of financial assistance and job opportunities. The funding has been coordinated by the country's Ministry of Finance and with assistance from international organizations.

In early 2019, some residents of the poorer villages of Sohag were able to move into their new homes built, in part, with aid from the National Bank of Kuwait. There was a celebration for the completion of 115 homes where residents also received cattle and other gifts.

Archaeology
In April 2019, the archaeological mission of the Ministry of Antiquities led by Mostafa Waziri uncovered a tomb of a nobleman called Toutou and his wife at Al-Dayabat archaeological site dating back to the Ptolemaic era. The tomb contained two tiny rooms with two limestone sarcophagi. Besides, well preserved mummy, mummified animals and birds including falcons, eagles, cats, dogs and shrews were also revealed in the tomb.

Municipal divisions
The governorate is divided into municipal divisions with a total estimated population as of July 2017 of 4,995,155. In the case of Sohag governorate, there are two new cities, five agsam and twelve marakiz. In some instances there is a markaz and a kism with the same name.

Population

According to population estimates, in 2015 the majority of residents in the governorate lived in rural areas, with an urbanization rate of only 21.4%. Out of an estimated 4,603,861 people residing in the governorate in 2015, 3,618,543 people lived in rural areas and 985,318 lived in urban areas.

Cities and towns
 Akhmim (Ipu or Khent-Min or Khemmis or Panopolis)
 Dar El Salam
 El Balyana
 El Mansha
 El Maragha
 El Usayrat
 Girga (Tjeny or Thinis)
 Juhayna
 Sakulta
 Sohag
 Tahta
 Tima

Industrial zones
According to the Egyptian Governing Authority for Investment and Free Zones (GAFI), in affiliation with the Ministry of Investment (MOI), the following industrial zones are located in this governorate:
Al Kawthar District 
Al Ahaiwa
Beit Dawood, west of Gerga
West Of Tahta 
(New urban community industrial zone) New Sohag

Important sites
 Abydos (Abedju)
 Apollonos Polis (Kom Isfaht)
 Beit Khallaf
 El Hawawish
 El Salamuni
 Gabal El Haridi
 Hut-Repyt (Athribis or Wannina)
 Kom Ishqaw (Aphrodito)
 Tjebu (Djew-Qa or Antaeopolis or Qaw el-Kebir)
Red Monastery
White Monastery
 Sohag Museum

Notable people
 Imad Hamdi (actor) 
 Hamdy Ahmed (actor)
 George Sidhum (actor)

References

External links
 El Wattan News of Sohag Governorate
Hopkins, Nicholas S., Directions of Change in Rural Egypt, Oxford University Press, 2004

 
Governorates of Egypt